Genstat (General Statistics) is a statistical software package with data analysis capabilities, particularly in the field of agriculture.

It was developed in 1968 by the Rothamsted Research in the United Kingdom and was designed to provide modular design, linear mixed models and graphical functions. It was developed and distributed by VSN International (VSNi), which was owned by The Numerical Algorithms Group and Rothamsted Research.

Genstat is used in a number of research areas, including plant science, forestry, animal science, and medicine.

See also 
 ASReml: a statistical package which fits linear mixed models to large data sets with complex variance models, using Residual Maximum Likelihood (REML)

References

Further reading

External links
 Genstat homepage. VSN International (VSNi).

Fortran software
Statistical software
Windows-only software
Biostatistics